Fernando Cervantes is a Mexican historian and author. He is Reader in History at the University of Bristol.

He is a Lay Dominican.

Books
The Devil in the New World: The Impact of Diabolism in New Spain (Yale University Press, 1994)
Spiritual Encounters: Interactions between Christianity and Native Religions (1999)
The Hispanic World in the Historical Imagination (2005)
The Inquisition (2006)
Angels, Demons and the New World (Cambridge University Press, 2013)
Conquistadores: A New History of Spanish Discovery and Conquest (Viking, 2022)

References

Mexican writers
Mexican historians
Mexican Dominicans
Dominican tertiaries
Academics of the University of Bristol
Living people
Year of birth missing (living people)